Hasan Ayaroğlu (born 22 March 1995) is a Turkish footballer who plays as a winger for Bursaspor.

Career
Ayaroğlu is a youth product of Ankaragücü, having joined their youth academy in 2005. He made his professional debut with Ankaragücü in a 3–0 Süper Lig loss to Antalyaspor on 25 March 2012. In 2015, he transferred to Eskişehirspor, and was promptly loaned out to Ankaragücü and Kastamonuspor before returning to their first team. He transferred to Alanyaspor in 2018, and was with the club until January 2021. On 25 January 2021, he transferred to Denizlispor.

International career
Ayaroğlu is a youth international for Turkey, having represented the Turkey U18s, U19s, and U20s.

References

External links
 
 
 
 

1995 births
People from Çankırı
Turkish footballers
Turkey youth international footballers
Alanyaspor footballers
Denizlispor footballers
Bursaspor footballers
Association football wingers
Eskişehirspor footballers
Living people
MKE Ankaragücü footballers
Süper Lig players